Allan Royal (born August 17, 1944) is a Canadian actor, who is also sometimes credited as Allan G. Royal and Alan Royal. He is known for playing the crime reporter Tom Kirkwood on the hit Canadian police drama Night Heat  from 1985 to 1989. He is also known for his recurring role on such programs as the American TV drama Falcon Crest as well as roles in numerous other TV shows, movies, and plays.

Early career
Royal grew up in a bilingual home His father was a French Canadian and his mother was of British ancestry. He grew up in Montreal's West End. He began performing while still in high school, and ultimately left Montreal to study acting in New York with Lee Strasberg. He returned to Canada, performing on stage in Toronto beginning in the mid-1960s. He joined the Toronto Arts Production theater company, where he played a wide range of roles throughout the 1970s, in new plays as well as productions of Shakespeare and Molière.

Career
In 1985, Royal joined the cast of a new television production, Night Heat, which aired on both Canadian and American television. Prior to the end of Night Heat, he had moved to Los Angeles, where he hoped to appear in more films. He instead portrayed novelist R.D. Young on Falcon Crest. After playing the role for a year, he appeared in They Came from Outer Space from 1990 to 1991, and another TV series, Foreign Affairs, in 1992 and 1993.

Throughout the late 1980s well into the 2010s, Royal has worked steadily, appearing in productions that were made in the US and several that were made in Canada, such as the 1988 film Switching Channels, a remake of the 1931 movie classic Front Page, which was filmed in Toronto. In addition, he was in several made-for-TV movies, including a role as John Sculley in the 1999 production Pirates of Silicon Valley, and the role of Mark Roberts in the 1999 production of "Crime in Connecticut: The Story of Alex Kelly" (later renamed "Cry Rape"). Royal also portrayed Captain Braxton in two 1996 episodes of Star Trek: Voyager: "Future's End, Parts I and II". In addition, Royal appeared in other TV series, including Amerika, Forever Knight, Mutant X, Relic Hunter, The Practice, JAG, and The Border. He played Chief Constable Stockton in the Canadian detective show Murdoch Mysteries and Judge Phillip Hopkins in three episodes of Suits.

In 2011, he returned to the stage in Toronto, where he had not performed live since the early-1980s, to star in a one-man play, The Disappearing Act, which he also wrote.

Filmography

Film

Television

References

External links
 
 Allan Royal at Moviefone

1944 births
Living people
Anglophone Quebec people
Canadian male television actors
Canadian male voice actors
Canadian people of British descent
Male actors from Montreal